The Sadău is a left tributary of the river Suceava. Its source is located south of Dolishniy Shepit in Ukraine. The river then crosses the border into Romania, joining the Suceava near the village of Sadău.

References

Rivers of Romania
Rivers of Chernivtsi Oblast
Rivers of Suceava County